Hadali  is a town located in Khushab District in the Punjab Province of Pakistan. The town is administratively subdivided into two Union Councils, including Hadali-Ii.

History
Khushab District was a forested agricultural region during the Indus Valley civilization. The Vedic period was characterized by Indo-Aryan culture that invaded from Central Asia and settled in the Punjab region. The Kambojas, Daradas, Kaikayas, Madras, Pauravas, Yaudheyas, Malavas, and Kurus invaded, settled and ruled the ancient Punjab region.

After overrunning the Achaemenid Empire in 331 BCE, Alexander the Great marched into the Punjab region with an army of 50,000. The Khushab region was ruled by Maurya Empire, Indo-Greek kingdom, Kushan Empire, Gupta Empire, White Huns, Kushano-Hephthalites and the Turk and Hindu Shahi kingdoms.

In 997 CE, Sultan Mahmud Ghaznavi, took over the Ghaznavid dynasty empire established by his father, Sultan Sebuktegin. In 1005, he conquered the Shahis in Kabul in 1005, and followed it by the conquests of the Punjab region. The Delhi Sultanate and, later, the Mughal Empire ruled the region. The Punjab region became predominantly Muslim due to missionary Sufi saints whose dargahs dot the landscape.

After the decline of the Mughal Empire, the Sikh Empire invaded and occupied the Khushab District. During the period of British rule, Khushab district increased in population and importance.

The predominantly Muslim population of Khushab District supported the Muslim League and Pakistan movement. After independence in 1947, the minority Hindus and Sikhs migrated to India while the Muslim refugees, Rajputs, from India settled in the Hadali after Partition of India and Pakistan in 1947. Muslim Rajputs who migrated to India settled in the Hadali.

Economy 
Hadali's main source of income is agriculture. The main crops farmed in Hadali are sugarcane, gram (a type of pulse), wheat and rice.

The practice of cattle-farming also contributes to the economy in Hadali.

Notable people
 
 
Nilofar Bakhtiar (Chairperson of the National Commission on the Status of Women (NCSW)), (Former Federal Minister for Tourism of Pakistan)
Malik Khuda Buksh Tiwana, veteran politician, member National Assembly of Pakistan from Khushab District
 Khushwant Singh (1915 - 2014) was an Indian Sikh journalist and novelist born in 1915 in Hadali. Some of his ashes were scattered in Hadali.
Brigadier (R) Rashid Ali Malik (died in 2017) (1.Sitara-e-Imtiaz , 2.Tamgha-e-Basalat)

References

External links 
 

Populated places in Khushab District